The 209th Division was created in February 1949 under the Regulation of the Redesignations of All Organizations and Units of the Army, issued by Central Military Commission on November 1, 1948, basing on the 41st Brigade, 14th Column of Huabei Military Region, formed in May 1948.

In September 1949 the division was inactivated: the division's personnel, along with the personnel from 210th Division and the headquarter of 70th Corps were re-organized as 207th Division.

References

中国人民解放军各步兵师沿革, http://blog.sina.com.cn/s/blog_a3f74a990101cp1q.html

Infantry divisions of the People's Liberation Army
Military units and formations established in 1949
Military units and formations disestablished in 1949